The Samsung NX1000 is a digital compact camera produced and marketed by Samsung since April 2012 as an entry level camera with interchangeable lenses. It is a 20.3 Megapixel mirrorless interchangeable lens camera using the Samsung NX-mount.

The NX1000 is comparable in weight and size with cameras such as the Sony NEX, Nikon 1 and the Micro Four Thirds series of cameras. 

The NX1000 includes the i-Function lens control system and built-in WiFi for connection to online services such as email and social networking.

See also
 Samsung NX series

References

External links 
 Samsung NX1000 Product Page

NX1000
Live-preview digital cameras